The men's discus throw event at the 2007 World Championships in Athletics took place on August 26, 2007 (qualification) and August 28, 2007 (final) at the Nagai Stadium in Osaka, Japan.

Medallists

Abbreviations
All results shown are in metres

Records

Results

Qualification

Group A

Group B

Final

References
Official results, qualification - IAAF.org
Official results, final - IAAF.org

Discus throw
Discus throw at the World Athletics Championships